"Ist das alles?" [Is that all?] is a punk song by the band Die Ärzte. It was the fourth track and the second single from their 1986 album Die Ärzte. The song follows the woes of a young man suffering the hardships inflicted upon him by his environment, making him tired of life and prompting him to repeatedly ask his tormentors, "Is that all?"  

An early unreleased version of the song, written in 1983, was titled "Omakiller" (Grandma killer).

Track listing 

 "Ist das alles?" (Felsenheimer) - 3:37
 "Sweet Sweet Gwendoline" (Urlaub) - 2:48

B-sides
"Sweet Sweet Gwendoline" is also from "Die Ärzte".

1986 singles
Die Ärzte songs
Songs written by Bela B.